Tina Poitras (born October 5, 1970 in Thompson, Manitoba) is a former race walker from Canada, who competed for her native country at two Summer Olympics: Barcelona 1992 and Atlanta 1996. She set her personal best time of 44:32 in the women's 10 km event in 1997.

Poitras was given the Terry Fox Humanitarian award in 1992 in recognition of her 'social spirit, humanitarian and community service, while maintaining excellence in academic, amateur sport and physical well-being'.

Achievements

References

Profile
Tina Poitras' website

External links
 
 
 
 

1970 births
Living people
Canadian female racewalkers
Athletes (track and field) at the 1992 Summer Olympics
Athletes (track and field) at the 1996 Summer Olympics
Olympic track and field athletes of Canada
People from Thompson, Manitoba
Sportspeople from Manitoba
World Athletics Championships athletes for Canada
Competitors at the 1991 Summer Universiade